Nidelric is a Cambrian genus of scleritomous organism, tentatively interpreted as a chancelloriid.

Species
Two species are described in the genus:

 Nidelric gaoloufangensis Zhao et al. 2018
 Nidelric pugio Hou et al. 2014 – type species

References

Cambrian genera